Ancient Greek Numbers is a Unicode block containing acrophonic numerals used in ancient Greece, including ligatures and special symbols.

Block

History
The following Unicode-related documents record the purpose and process of defining specific characters in the Ancient Greek Numbers block:

References 

Unicode blocks